
The following is a list of Historic Mechanical Engineering Landmarks as designated by the American Society of Mechanical Engineers (ASME) since it began the program in 1971. The designation is granted to existing artifacts or systems representing significant mechanical engineering technology. Mechanical Engineering Heritage Sites are particular locales at which some event or development occurred or which some machine, building, or complex of significance occupied. Also Mechanical Engineering Heritage Collections refers to a museum or collection that includes related objects of special significance to, but not necessarily a major evolutionary step in, the historical development of mechanical engineering.

Clicking the landmark number in the first column will take you to the ASME page on the site where you will also find the downloadable brochure from the dedication.

There are over 275 landmarks on the list.

See also 
 American Society of Mechanical Engineers (ASME)
 Institution of Mechanical Engineers
 List of Historic Civil Engineering Landmarks
 Mechanical Engineering Heritage (Japan)

References

External links
 
 American Society of Mechanical Engineers Landmarks

American Society of Mechanical Engineers
 
Historic Mechanical Engineering Landmarks
Mechanical Engineering Landmarks